Igor Rabello da Costa (born 28 April 1995), known as Igor Rabello, is a Brazilian footballer who plays for Atlético Mineiro as a central defender.

Club career
Born in Rio de Janeiro, Rabello joined Botafogo's youth setup in 2012, from rivals Fluminense. Promoted to the first team in December 2015, he made his senior debut the following 29 April by starting in a 1–1 Copa do Brasil home draw against Coruripe.

After being rarely used, Rabello joined Série B side Náutico on 20 May 2016, on loan until the end of the year. He contributed with two goals in 15 appearances for the club, his first coming on 4 September in a 4–3 away loss against Sampaio Corrêa.

Upon returning to Bota, Rabello became a regular starter and made his Série A debut on 15 May 2017, starting in a 2–0 loss at Grêmio. On 5 June, he renewed his contract until the end of 2019.

Rabello scored his first goal in the category on 24 October 2017, netting the winner in a 2–1 home defeat of Corinthians.

On 4 January 2019, Rabello joined Atlético Mineiro on a five-year deal.

Career statistics

Honours

Club
Botafogo
 Campeonato Carioca: 2018

Atlético Mineiro
 Campeonato Brasileiro Série A: 2021
 Copa do Brasil: 2021
 Campeonato Mineiro: 2020, 2021, 2022
 Supercopa do Brasil: 2022

Individual
 Campeonato Carioca Team of the Year: 2018
 Campeonato Mineiro Team of the Year: 2021

References

External links
 

1995 births
Living people
Footballers from Rio de Janeiro (city)
Brazilian footballers
Association football defenders
Campeonato Brasileiro Série A players
Campeonato Brasileiro Série B players
Botafogo de Futebol e Regatas players
Clube Náutico Capibaribe players
Clube Atlético Mineiro players